The list of disasters in Romania by death toll includes major disasters and accidents – excluding warfare and other intentional acts – that took place on Romanian soil and resulted in at least five fatalities:

Disasters

References 

 
Romania
Romania